Reginald Morris may refer to:

Reggie Morris (1886–1928), American actor and filmmaker
Reginald H. Morris (1918–2004), British-Canadian cinematographer